Annasley Park (born 24 April 1996) is an English former professional racing cyclist, who rode professionally between 2016 and 2018 for Team Breeze and . She rode in the women's road race at the 2016 UCI Road World Championships, finishing in 82nd place. Park finished second in the individual standings of the 2017 Matrix Fitness Grand Prix Series.

Major results

2015
 10th London Nocturne
2016
 Dublin Track Cycling International
2nd Individual pursuit
3rd Scratch
2017
 1st  Team pursuit, National Track Championships (with Ellie Dickinson, Manon Lloyd and Emily Nelson)
 2nd Overall Matrix Fitness Grand Prix Series

References

External links
 
 

1996 births
Living people
English female cyclists
Sportspeople from Hereford